Boeing Boeing is a 1985 Indian Malayalam-language romantic comedy film written and directed by Priyadarshan.The movie is a remake of 1965 film Boeing Boeing which was based on the 1960 French play of the same name. The plot follows Shyam (Mohanlal) who is dating three flight attendants at the same time and the scenario get complicated with the arrival of his friend Anilkumar (Mukesh) along with other obstructions.

The film is regarded as one of the best comedy films in Malayalam cinema. The film was a blockbuster and remains one of the cult classic comic capers in Malayalam cinema.  It was remade in Telugu as Chilakkottudu (1997) and in Kannada as Nee Tata Naa Birla. Priyadarshan remade it in Hindi in 2005 as Garam Masala. Mohanlal and Mukesh combo become famous after this movie.

Synopsis
Shyam is a silver tongued but essentially likeable weasel. He's a flirt, engaged to Sreekutty. He doesn't have much luck with women or his career, but when a bunch of opportunists seem to pop into his life with all kinds of dreamy offers, he bites. Suddenly, he finds himself stirring an ambitious fiancée soup, dating three air hostesses introduced to him by Lambodharan, and driving cars he doesn't own with the help of his friend, driver Kuttappan. He rises to the occasion admirably. Even as he meticulously takes down flight schedules and itinerary details, he finds himself flummoxed on many a turn, where he lies magnificently through his teeth. Soon, he's 'in the zone', and a complete player, addicted to the thrills of infidelity and everyone is a co-conspirator. 
Anil is a smarmy stud with an exuberant lack of scruples. While managing to wangle his way to a promotion, a Mumbai trip, he looks up to Shyam. Despite the obvious rivalry, Anil decides to move in as acolyte. Shyam is a pro, and wants Anil out of his life, but has to begrudgingly admit that he's a huge help with the ladies. Anil acts unflappable with others around, but grovels in front of Shyam to let him stay. Beneath the egos and competition, however, it's pretty visible that these two like each other. Another one stirring the broth is Mrs. Dick aka Dickammayi, a moody chef whose husband eloped and married her sister.  She has been warned about women in the house, but is unaware that her domestic duties would involve shuffling pictures in and out of photo frames and making three different kinds of dinner on the same night. Justifiably, she often flies off the handle and vainly demands a never-forthcoming raise.

Eventually, Shyam and Anil are devastated by the airhostess-surfing game they play. They barely manage to disengage from a lethal imbroglio and look set to quit while they're still ahead. Both men are exhausted, downbeat and seemingly resigned to their fate. Elena, one of the three airhostess starts feeling a soft corner for Anil and they decide to lead a life together. Shyam and Anil size each other up and sigh wearily, and just when they're going to throw in the towel, they solemnly make their decision. 'One for you, two for me,' Shyam mutters. Anil, equally cool, nods and seals the deal. But the commotion doesn't end there. The other two air hostesses find out that they have been cheated. In the end both Shyam and Anil realize their mistakes and Shyam decides to marry his "murapennu",  Sreekutty.

Cast

Mohanlal as Shyam
Mukesh as Anilkumar
Lissy as Eleena (1st air-hostess)
Madhuri as Padma (2nd air-hostess)
Ashwini as Indhu (3rd air-hostess)
Menaka as Sreekutty
Jagathy Sreekumar as O. P. Olassa
Sukumari as Dick Ammayi
Maniyanpilla Raju as Kuttappan
M. G. Soman as Lambodharan Pillai
Sankaradi as M. T. E. Damodaran
K. P. A. C. Sunny as Sreekandan Nair
Oduvil Unnikrishnan as Ramankutty Shop Owner	
Bobby Kottarakkara as (Tea Shop Owner)
Kaduvakulam Antony as Fake father
Manavalan Joseph as Father of Sreekutty
Priya as item number "Boeing Boeing"
Vallathol Unnikrishnan as Priest
Shankar as Man at the Restaurant (cameo)
 Pavitran as Ettuveetil Raghavan Pillai

Kottayam Santha gave voice (dubbed) for all the female lead characters in the film.

Soundtrack
The music was composed by Raghu Kumar and lyrics was written by Mankombu Gopalakrishnan. The film was scored by K. J. Joy.

See also
Boeing Boeing (1965 film)
Chilakkottudu
Garam Masala (2005 film)
Nee Tata Naa Birla

References

External links 
 

Malayalam films remade in other languages
1985 films
1980s Malayalam-language films
Films directed by Priyadarshan
Films scored by Raghu Kumar
Indian films based on plays
Indian comedy films
Indian remakes of American films